David Kufeld (born 1958 or 1959) is an American-Israeli former professional basketball player. He became the first Orthodox Jew selected in the NBA draft when the Portland Trail Blazers drafted him in the 10th round of the 1980 draft.

Early life
Kufeld was born in New York City and grew up in Great Neck, New York on Long Island. He attended the Manhattan Talmudical Academy and played on the school's varsity basketball team for all four years of high school.

College basketball career
After high school, Kufeld attended Yeshiva University and played center for the Yeshiva Maccabees basketball team. Despite the school's limited resources – Yeshiva did not even have a gym during his time there – Kufeld led all Division III players in the country in rebounding for his junior and senior year (1978–79 and 1979–80). In his senior year, he was named an All-American, and the Jewish Sports Review named him the National Jewish Player of the Year for Division II and Division III in 1979 and 1980. As of 2019, Kufeld is fifth all-time in Division III for rebounds per game.

Kufeld majored in public relations and advertising at Yeshiva. Ahead of the 1980 NBA draft, he sent self-promotional packets to ten NBA teams.

Professional basketball career
The Portland Trail Blazers selected Kufeld with the 205th pick in the 10th round of the 1980 NBA draft. The team's owner and president, Larry Weinberg, was also Jewish. Kufeld attended rookie camp with the rest of his draft class, but at 6'8" he was considered too small to play as a center in the NBA. After four days of rookie camp, Weinberg cut Kufeld.

If Kufeld had been signed to an NBA roster, as a shomer Shabbat Jew, he would not have been able to travel, practice, or play in games during the Jewish Sabbath (Friday through Saturday night).

Kufeld signed with Maccabi Ironi Ramat Gan of the Israeli Premier Basketball League. Because Kufeld had not officially made aliyah to Israel, the team named him its designated foreign player, a spot that usually went to foreign non-Jews who were not eligible for Israeli citizenship under the Law of Return. He played one season in Israel and one season in the Eastern Professional Basketball League (later renamed the Continental Basketball Association).

After basketball
In the 1990s, Kufeld founded and served as president of the Jewish Sports Congress. He was a public relations executive at the Weitz & Luxenberg law firm in Manhattan for 23 years.

Kufeld and his wife, Suri, had two children, who live in Israel. In 2019, Kufeld and his wife made aliyah and moved to Israel.

In 2019, Kufeld was inducted into the Yeshiva University's Athletic Hall of Fame.

See also
 Tamir Goodman, former American-Israeli Orthodox Jewish basketball player dubbed the "Jewish Jordan" in the early 2000s
 Ryan Turell, former Yeshiva University basketball star who was the first Orthodox Jew to be selected in the NBA G League draft

References

Living people
American Orthodox Jews
Israeli Basketball Premier League players
Jewish men's basketball players
American men's basketball players